What Do You Love (WDYL) was a metasearch engine from Google. The main purpose of WDYL is to get more of what you love by searching across numerous Google products with one click. The search is censored with search words deemed inappropriate by Google resulting in the user being redirected to the WDYL page for kittens with an image of a rainbow in the background. The service is now inactive, with the URL resulting in a 404 response.

References

External links
 

Google services
Internet search engines
Internet properties established in 2011